"Closure" is the debut single by Australian pop duo Scarlett Belle. It was written by Reigan Derry, Rudy Sandapa and Tamara Jaber, and produced by Sandapa. The song was released physically on 4 June 2010 and digitally on 18 June 2010. Upon its release, "Closure" peaked at number 38 on the ARIA Singles Chart.

Production and release
"Closure" was written by Reigan Derry, Rudy Sandapa and Tamara Jaber, and produced by Sandapa. It was also recorded by Sandapa and engineered by Carlos Oyanedel. Phil Tan mixed the track and the mastering was done by Toby Learmont and Tom Coyne. The physical edition of "Closure" was released on 4 June 2010, featuring a Static Revenger remix of "Closure" and the B-side track "Girl That Weeps". The song was later released as a digital extended play (EP) on 18 June 2010. For the week commencing 28 June 2010, "Closure" debuted and peaked at number 38 on the ARIA Singles Chart. It only spent a total of three weeks in the top fifty.

Personnel
Vocals – Scarlett Belle
Songwriting – Reigan Derry, Rudy Sandapa, Tamara Jaber
Production – Rudy Sandapa
Engineering – Carlos Oyanedel
Recording – Rudy Sandapa
Mixing – Phil Tan
Mastering – Toby Learmont, Tom Coyne

Source:

Track listing

Digital EP
 "Closure" (Radio Edit) – 3:35
 "Closure" (Static Revenger Remix) – 5:08
 "Girl That Weeps" – 3:21
 "Closure" (Chico Esteban Radio Edit) – 2:46
 "Closure" (Chico Esteban Extended Remix) – 6:24

CD single
 "Closure" (Radio Edit) – 3:35
 "Closure" (Static Revenger Remix) – 5:08 
 "Girl That Weeps" – 3:21

Charts

Release history

References

2010 songs
2010 debut singles
Scarlett Belle songs
Sony Music Australia singles
Songs written by Reigan Derry